The 12583 / 12584 Lucknow Jn.–Anand Vihar Terminal AC Double Decker Express is an Indian Railways train running between  and . It is the ninth double decker train in India and is the first such service for the state of Uttar Pradesh. The train operates four days a week on Tuesdays, Thursdays, Fridays and Sundays from both ends. After Lucknow Mail, Lucknow–New Delhi AC Superfast Express, Lucknow Swarna Shatabdi Express and Gomti Express, it is the fifth dedicated train service between the national capital and the state capital of Uttar Pradesh. The other train service is by IRCTC by the name of Lucknow - New Delhi Tejas Express.

Trials and Clearance Certificate
The rake for this train was procured by North Eastern Railways, Lucknow Division from the Rail Coach Factory, Kapurthala on 21 April 2014.
The first trials of the train on its route were carried out on 18 October 2014. The train departed from Lucknow Jn. at 10 AM and reached Anand Vihar Terminal within 7 hours 40 minutes. While the trials were mostly successful, on its way back, the train brushed against the wall of a platform at Moradabad Jn forcing the station authorities to modify a part of the platform. Followed by this, rigorous trials at all platforms of Lucknow Junction railway station were carried out the following day. Finally the safety clearance from Research Design and Standards Organisation (RDSO) was given  and the train chugged off after four months.

Inauguration
This train service was flagged off on 26 April 2015 from the Anand Vihar Terminal by the Union Home minister Mr. Rajnath Singh in the presence of the Union Railway Minister Mr.Suresh Prabhu and the Minister of State for Railways, Mr. Manoj Sinha. Nearly 650 people travelled in the inaugural run of this train.

Journey

In return the train starts back at 14:05 from Anand Vihar Terminal to reach back Lucknow Jn at 22:30  the same day.
The Time table is as follows:

12583 Lucknow Junction NER to Anand Vihar Terminal

12584 Anand Vihar Terminal to Lucknow Jn NER

Introduction of catering services
In a response to the numerous complaints from passengers pertaining to unavailability of catering services and buffet car in the train, North Eastern Railways consented to initiate the facility with effect from 17 July 2015. Vendors providing lunch, dinner, beverages, drinking water and snacks are now available aboard. E-catering service is yet to be introduced.

Coach composition

The train was inaugurated and further planned to run with twelve Double Decked LHB AC Chair Car coaches, but due to technical reasons, the composition was revised to ten such coaches and two generator cum luggage vans at each end. Each coach has a sitting capacity of 120 passengers. The coach composition was again revised on 29 July 2018, when 2 AC Double Decker Chair Car Coaches were removed and sent for repairs. As of now, the trains runs with a 10 coach composition, with 2 EOGs and 8 AC Double Decker Chair Car Coaches, headed by a Ghaziabad Shed Electric Loco.

The coach composition is as follows:
12583: LOCO-
12584: LOCO-

Here 'LOCO' denotes the direction of the locomotive. '' stands for End-On-Generator Van and  through  are AC Chair Car Coaches. The rake is non-self-generating LHB type and the maximum permissible speed of the rolling stock is 160 kmph though due to sectional speed restrictions, the train only touches a maximum speed of 110 kmph.

Quota allocation
The figures mentioned denote the total number of seats available for booking in this train from the mentioned station under the respective quotas.

12583 Lucknow Jn NER to Anand Vihar Terminal

'''12584 Anand Vihar Terminal to Lucknow Jn NER

Extension and linkage to Jaipur-bound Double Decker service
Unavailability of pit lines for maintenance of the train at Lucknow Junction is posing difficulties in operation of the train on a daily basis. Hence it has been proposed to link the service to the Jaipur bound Double Decker Service from Delhi. The Ghaziabad–Delhi Sarai Rohilla section is currently being surveyed for feasibility of operation. With the change in place the timings may be changed to a 9AM departure from Lucknow and around 11AM departure from Delhi.

Accidents
On 28 June 2015, the C-5 coach of the Anand Vihar bound train caught fire due to jamming of brakes to the wheels. The incident happened near Karuha station (9 km from Hardoi, 110 km from Lucknow Jn.). Though the incident was soon noticed and attended and hence no casualties were reported. After a delay of approximately two hours, the train was made to depart.

Gallery

References

Passenger trains originating from Lucknow
Transport in Delhi
Rail transport in Delhi
Railway services introduced in 2015
Double-decker trains of India